George W. Graham, Jr. (February 16, 1949 – May 15, 2022) was a former Democratic member of the North Carolina General Assembly . He represented the 12th district. Graham served the NC House from 2013 through 2018 and served as member of the Lenoir County Board of Commissioners for over 30 years.

References

External links

North Carolina Democrats
African-American state legislators in North Carolina
Businesspeople from North Carolina
1949 births
21st-century American politicians
21st-century African-American politicians
20th-century African-American people
2022_deaths